Tipton Catholic High School is a private Roman Catholic high school in Tipton, Kansas, United States.  It is located in the Roman Catholic Diocese of Salina.  With an enrollment of 22, it is one of the smallest high schools in Kansas.

History
Tipton Catholic High School was established in 1919. Grades 7 and 8 were added in 2003 and it became known as Tipton Catholic Jr./Sr. High School. In 2011 grades 7 through 8 were moved to the Tipton Community Catholic School and it again was Tipton Catholic High School.

Athletics
Tipton Catholic fields teams with St. John's of Beloit in a co-operative agreement.

See also

 List of high schools in Kansas
 List of unified school districts in Kansas

References

External links
 School Website

Roman Catholic Diocese of Salina
Catholic secondary schools in Kansas
Schools in Mitchell County, Kansas
Educational institutions established in 1919
1919 establishments in Kansas